Mirandornithes is a clade that consists of flamingos and grebes. Many scholars use the term Phoenicopterimorphae for the superorder containing flamingoes and grebes.

Determining the relationships of both groups has been problematic. Flamingos had been placed with numerous branches within Neognathae, such as ducks and storks. The grebes had been placed with the loons. However recent studies have confirmed these two branches as sister groups.

Both primitive phoenicopteriformes and their closest relatives, the grebes, were highly aquatic. This indicates that the entire mirandornithe group evolved from aquatic, probably swimming ancestors.

Synapomorphies
According to Mayr (2004) and Sangster (2005) there are at least twelve distinct morphological synapomorphies that are unique to this clade:
 "At least the fourth to seventh cervical vertebrae strongly elongate, with processus spinosus forming a marked ridge.
 Humerus with a marked oval depression at insertion site of musculus scapulohumeralis cranialis.
 At least 23 presacral vertebrae.
 At least four thoracic vertebrae fused to a notarium.
 Distal end of ulna with marked oval depression radialis.
 Phalanx proximalis digiti majoris very elongate and narrow craniocaudally.
 Distal rim of condylus medialis of tibiotarsus distinctly notched.
 Pars acetabularis of musculus iliotibialis lateralis absent.
 Pars caudalis of musculus caudofemoralis absent.
 Wing with 12 primaries
 Left arteria carotis reduced or absent.
 Eggs covered with a chalky layer of amorphous calcium phosphate."

References

Neognathae